Four Songs is the debut EP of London-born Alexi Murdoch. It was released in November 2002. Thre songs from the EP ("Orange Sky", "Blue Mind" and "Song for You") were later re-recorded for Alexi Murdoch debut album Time Without Consequence.

Uses in other media
The song "Orange Sky" has been featured in the television shows Prison Break (the episode English, Fitz or Percy),  The O.C. (and its soundtrack album Music from The O.C. Mix 1), Dawson's Creek, and in the film Garden State.

"Blue Mind" was also featured in Dawson's Creek.

Track listing
"It's Only Fear" – 4:22
"Orange Sky" – 6:19
"Blue Mind" – 5:15
"Song for You" – 4:17

Personnel
Alexi Murdoch - vocals, guitar, electric guitar, slide guitar, banjo
Chad Fischer - keyboards, bass, drums, percussion
Joel Shearer - electric guitar
Larry Goldings - piano, keyboards
Pete Adams - harmonium
Andrew Bush - bass
Jay Bellerose  - drums, percussion, cymbals, tabla
James SK Wān - bamboo flute
Renee Stahl - background vocals

References

External links
Alexi Murdoch

2002 debut EPs
Alexi Murdoch albums
Albums produced by Chad Fischer